Pop! The First 20 Hits is a greatest hits collection from Erasure, released on 16 November 1992 in Germany and the UK and 24 November 1992 in the United States. The album utilises a straightforward format: all of Erasure's singles up to that point, sequenced in chronological order with the addition of the Hamburg Mix of Erasure's first ever single, "Who Needs Love (Like That)".

In the UK, "Who Needs Love Like That" was released as a single in remixed form ("The Hamburg Mix", a reference to Erasure's extensive touring of Hamburg during the band's formative period). This is included as a bonus track on the UK version of the album, although in the US it only appears on the cassette release, failing to appear on the CD.

Pop! The First 20 Hits became Erasure's fourth consecutive number-one album in the UK. In Germany the album hit number 12 and in the US it peaked at number 112 on the Billboard 200, where it was certified Gold nearly 10 years later by the RIAA.

A limited-edition double CD was issued.

Pop! The First 20 Hits sequels include Pop2! The Second 20 Hits (direct sequel including the subsequent 20 singles sequenced chronologically) released 17 years later, and Total Pop! The First 40 Hits, the ultimate singles compilation as far as 2009.

Track listing

Track listing - Disc 2

Charts

Weekly charts

Year-end charts

Certifications

References

1992 greatest hits albums
Erasure compilation albums
Albums produced by Flood (producer)
Albums produced by Stephen Hague
Albums produced by Mark Saunders (record producer)
Albums produced by Gareth Jones (music producer)
Mute Records compilation albums